Paleoworld (season 1) is the first season of Paleoworld.

Episodes

Paleoworld